Viola Mónica Calligaris (born 17 March 1996) is a Swiss professional footballer who plays as a right back for Spanish Liga F club Levante UD and the Switzerland national team.

Career

Club
Calligaris began playing football at FC Giswil in Obwalden at a young age. In March 2009, she moved to FC Sachseln and in September of the same year, Calligaris moved to SC Kriens. She then went to SC Emmen United. In 2012, she began her professional career at SC Kriens. In 2013, Calligaris signed with Swiss powerhouse BSC Young Boys. For the 2017/18 season, she moved to Atlético Madrid in the Spanish Primera División.

International
With the U17 team, Calligaris played at the 2013 UEFA Women's Under-17 Championship qualification. Despite scoring nine goals in six matches, her team was unable to reach the tournament final stages. With the U19 team, she played at the 2014 and 2015 UEFA Women's Under-19 Championship qualification phases, but Switzerland failed to qualify for both of the tournaments. In March 2016, Calligaris debuted for the Swiss senior team in two friendly matches against the United States. On 3 July 2017, Calligaris was called up to the UEFA Women's Euro 2017 squad. She played in the match against France, replacing Martina Moser in the 65th minute. On 24 November 2017, in a match against Belarus in the 2019 FIFA Women's World Cup qualification phase, Calligaris scored her first senior international goal.

References

External links
 Player's Profile at Swiss Football Association
 
 

1996 births
Living people
Swiss women's footballers
Switzerland women's international footballers
Women's association football defenders
Swiss expatriate women's footballers
Swiss expatriate sportspeople in Spain
Expatriate women's footballers in Spain
Atlético Madrid Femenino players
Valencia CF Femenino players
Levante UD Femenino players
Swiss Women's Super League players
BSC YB Frauen players
People from Obwalden
UEFA Women's Euro 2022 players
Swiss people of Spanish descent
UEFA Women's Euro 2017 players
Primera División (women) players
21st-century Swiss women